Sampyeong-dong (삼평동, 三坪洞) is neighborhood of Bundang district in the city of Seongnam, Gyeonggi Province, South Korea.

Bundang
Neighbourhoods in South Korea